Thanh Thảo may refer to:

 Thanh Thảo (singer) (born 1977), Vietnamese singer and actress
 Thanh Thảo (poet) (born 1946), Vietnamese poet and journalist